Archaeopithecidae is an extinct family comprising two genera of notoungulate mammals, Teratopithecus and Archaeopithecus, both known from the Eocene of Argentina.

References

Further reading 
 F. Ameghino. 1897. Mammiféres crétacés de l’Argentine (Deuxième contribution à la connaissance de la fauna mammalogique de couches à Pyrotherium) [Cretaceous mammals of Argentina (second contribution to the knowledge of the mammalian fauna of the Pyrotherium Beds)]. Boletin Instituto Geografico Argentino 18(4–9):406-521
 McKenna, Malcolm C., and Bell, Susan K. 1997. Classification of Mammals Above the Species Level. Columbia University Press, New York, 631 pp. 

Typotheres
Eocene mammals
Eocene first appearances
Eocene extinctions
Casamayoran
Itaboraian
Riochican
Paleogene Argentina
Fossils of Argentina
Prehistoric mammal families